Monroe Township is a township in Anderson County, Kansas, United States. As of the 2010 census, its population was 349.

History
Monroe Township was established in 1857.

Geography
The county seat of Garnett, administratively separate from the township, occupies an area along the western border with Jackson Township. According to the USGS, it contains two cemeteries: Garnett and Judy.

References
 USGS Geographic Names Information System (GNIS)

External links
 City-Data.com

Townships in Anderson County, Kansas
Townships in Kansas
1857 establishments in Kansas Territory